"Green-Eyed Lady" is a popular single by the American rock band Sugarloaf. Written by Jerry Corbetta, J.C. Phillips and David Riordan,  it was featured on the band's debut album, Sugarloaf and was their first single. It peaked at number three on the Billboard Hot 100 in 1970 and was RPM magazine's number one single for two weeks. It has been featured on dozens of compilation albums.

Single versions
The single was released in the United States in three different versions sharing the same catalog number (Liberty 56183), but different matrix numbers on the record labels. The original single release (LB-2860-S) was a 5:58 version with no edits but an early fadeout, almost immediately after the last verse.
This was edited down to 2:58 on the mono/stereo promotional single (LB-2860-DJ/LB-2860-S-DJ) for radio airplay in which the entire organ and guitar solos are edited out.  When "Green-Eyed Lady" started climbing the charts, the recording was reworked one last time to include a shortened piece of the organ/guitar break on a single (LB-2860-S-RE) that has become the common 3:33 version used by radio stations today. Aside from other minor edits, the two shorter tracks begin with the opening's third bar and also end with early fadeouts. The album version ended with a cadence in the organ.

Critical reception
"Green-Eyed Lady" received generally positive reviews. One reviewer called it "jazzy and memorable", while John Laycock of the Windsor Star called it a "bewitching single".

Chart performance

Weekly charts

Year-end charts

In popular culture
Four years after the release of the single, Sugarloaf described the process of recording "Green-Eyed Lady" and selling it to the recording industry (namely the failed attempt to get CBS Records to distribute the record) in their song "Don't Call Us, We'll Call You," which also became a hit.

The song is featured in the 1997 comedy film Home Alone 3, starring Alex D. Linz and Rya Kihlstedt.

References

1970 singles
Liberty Records singles
Songs written by Jerry Corbetta
Sugarloaf (band) songs
1970 songs
RPM Top Singles number-one singles